The Al Jazeera effect is a term used in political science and media studies to describe the impact of new media and media sources on global politics, namely, reducing the government and mainstream media monopoly on information and empowering groups which previously lacked a global voice. The primary example is the effect's namesake – the impact of the Al Jazeera Media Network on the politics of the Arab world.

Origin and use
Al Jazeera was created in 1996 with the combination of the Emir of Qatar's money and talent from the defunct BBC Arabic service. It started as a response to the strict control that many governments in Arab League countries exercised over most forms of journalism as well as the lack of a free press. Audiences and journalists alike were drawn to Al Jazeera’s goal of reporting news without government censorship, as well as its recruitment of expert journalists who covered multiple perspectives on a singular issue. At the time, the viewing public did not respect journalism because it considered most reporters to be mouthpieces for dictators or political groups. The Emir of Qatar sought to break the heavy handed media management by the government because he had progressive ideas of expanding political participation and allowing independent press.

Similarly, founders set up Al Jazeera to counter the dominant Western viewpoint of Arabs and Arabic culture throughout the 20th century. Arabs depended on the BBC and CNN International – but were frustrated they had to listen to the Western viewpoints about themselves. William Lafi Youmans attributes the first use of the term to Philip Seib, author of The Al Jazeera Effect: How the New Global Media Are Reshaping World Politics (2008). However, Simon Henderson, who in turn attributes the term to "diplomats in the region", had used it as early as 2000. As used by Henderson, the Al Jazeera effect originally referred to Arab Middle East governments losing their monopoly on information because of the popularity and easy access to the Al Jazeera satellite television media network, and scholars still often use it in such a limited context. Thomas L. McPhail used it to refer to the changes in all of the Arab media. Seib generalized it to other, Internet-powered new media worldwide.

Al Jazeera challenges authoritarian governments by stimulating discussion on topics and through its provision of multiple perspectives and opinions. Al Jazeera's motto is "The Opinion and the Other Opinion", demonstrating its dedication to covering multiple perspectives rather than taking one stand on an issue.  It also takes the position in reporting as the “voice of the voiceless” rather than relying solely on official statements from officials and other figures of power. Al Jazeera was not the first Arab satellite channel, but it did provide new standards and production values in Arab news media.

Impact
Al Jazeera ended the flow of information that followed the format of from the "West to the rest". Al Jazeera has focused on reporting news stories originating from underrepresented countries, countering the one-way flow of media information from the global north to the global south.  Egyptian dissident Saad al-Din Ibrahim spoke of Al-Jazeera as giving Arab citizens open public space and new opportunities for expression and assertion, which has been seen through its on-air talk shows, discussion, and phone-in programs. Various critics have acknowledged Al Jazeera’s role in aiding reforms during the 2005 Arab Spring, specifically in regards to its news coverage of Iraqi elections and Lebanese protests. 

Additionally, Al Jazeera created a voting system in which viewers could vote online, formulating a type of democracy via satellite system. This has been a useful tool in measuring public opinion, especially on controversial topics, in the Arab world.  As a result of Al Jazeera's programs, individuals in the Middle East have learned more about Western democracy and politics than from other previous sources. 

The Al Jazeera effect follows a similar pattern to the CNN effect and includes the accelerant effect, impediment effect, and agenda-setting effect. Seib noted that the Al Jazeera effect can be seen as parallel to the CNN effect, which states that coverage of international events can force otherwise uninvolved governments to take action. Whereas the CNN effect is used in the context of mainstream, traditional media networks such as CNN, the Al Jazeera effect generalizes this to newer media such as citizen journalist blogs, internet radio, and satellite broadcasting. He also argues that new media strengthen the identity of and give voice to previously marginalized groups, which previously lacked their own media outlets; he cites the Kurdish people as an example. Many of the new media organizations are affiliated with such groups, social movements or similar organizations. New media weaken the monopoly of many states on information, as even extensive Internet censorship in countries such as China is not wholly effective. He concludes that the new media, while not beyond being abused, are largely contributing to democratization and political reform worldwide. William Lafi Youmans notes that Seib's prediction that the Al Jazeera effect will lead to changes in the politics of the Middle East was realized in the early 2010s during the Arab Spring, with new media provoking widespread debate and unrest within the region. The CNN effect and Al Jazeera effect have had a tremendous impact on policies and the government. They have both influenced foreign policies of the US. the existence of such news organizations is crucial for having global communications and is promising in terms of spreading democracy.

Subaltern 
The Al Jazeera effect has also been referred to as a subaltern, in reference to subaltern (post colonialism). Subaltern, depending on the context and where the subaltern is present, resembles something of opposition to the status quo through the demographic that does not have the capital to have their voices be heard; this form of alternative media gives a "voice to the voiceless". This notion of the subaltern is discussed by scholars, such as Gayatri Chakravorty Spivak.

See also
Slashdot effect
Voice of the Arabs

References

Further reading
 
 Khogali, Walied, and Anita Krajnc, Al-Jazeera Effect' Counters 'CNN Effect': Canadians Deserve Al Jazeera", Toward Freedom, 5 June 2009
 Miles, Hugh The Al Jazeera Effect, Foreign Policy, 9 February 2011
 Ricchiardi, Sherry "The Al Jazeera Effect", American Journalism Review, March & April 2011
 
 Zingarelli, Megan E. The CNN Effect and the Al Jazeera Effect, Master's Thesis

Al Jazeera
Mass media issues